The  were a class of rescue ship / tugboat of the Imperial Japanese Navy (IJN), serving during World War II.

Background
Under the Russo-Japanese War, the IJN purchased many steamships and converted them to salvage vessels. However, when they entered in 1930s, deterioration became remarkable. The IJN initially planned for the Tategami class to succeed them. The IJN was going to build the  one by one for three years from fiscal year 1936. However, the plan came to an impasse due to budget shortages by the second year. The IJN postponed building of the second ship for two years, and built two cheap 600-ton ships instead: the Hashima (later renamed Kasashima) and Futakami.

Ships in class

Footnotes

Bibliography 
The Maru Special, Japanese Naval Vessels No.47, "Japanese naval mine warfare crafts",  (Japan), January 1981.
Editorial Committee of the Navy, Navy Vol. 11, "Part of small vessels, auxiliary vessels, miscellaneous service ship and converted merchant ships", Seibunsha K.K. (Japan), August 1981.
50 year History of Harima Zōsen, Harima Zōsen Corporation, November 1960.
Shinshichirō Komamiya, The Wartime Convoy Histories,  (Japan), October 1987.
, National Archives of Japan
Reference code: C05110820900, [Data in English is under preparation] 第４８９０号 １２．９．２２ ６００屯救難船兼曳船缶用管間邪魔板製造の件.
Reference code: C05110821000, [Data in English is under preparation] 第４８９１号 １２．９．２２ ６００屯救難船兼曳船缶用重油噴燃器及コ-ン製造の件.
Monthly Ships of the World No. 500, Ships of the Imperial Japanese Navy", (Japan), August 1995.

World War II naval ships of Japan
Tugboats
Auxiliary tugboat classes